The Maldives Civil Aviation Authority is the civil aviation authority of the Maldives, headquartered in Malé.

See also
 Ministry of Civil Aviation and Communication Maldives

References

External links
 Maldives Civil Aviation Authority
Flight Information Region In Maldives
Civil aviation in the Maldives
Government of the Maldives
Civil aviation authorities in Asia
Transport organisations based in the Maldives